{{Speciesbox
| image = Carex spectabilis 6241.JPG
| genus = Carex 
| species = spectabilis
| authority = Dewey
| synonyms =
Carex invisa L.H.Bailey
Carex melastoma Fisch.
Carex melastoma Fisch. ex Boott
Carex nigella Boott
Carex spectabilis f. alpina Holm
Carex spectabilis f. chrysantha Holm
Carex spectabilis var. elegantula HolmCarex spectabilis var. gelida Holm
Carex spectabilis var. superba HolmCarex tolmiei BoottCarex tolmiei var. invisa (L.H.Bailey) Kük.Carex tolmiei var. nigella (Boott) Kük.Carex tolmiei var. nigella (Boott) L.H.Bailey
| synonyms_ref = 
}}Carex spectabilis is a species of sedge known by the common name showy sedge.

DescriptionCarex spectabilis produces clusters of stems 50 to 90 centimeters in maximum height, sometimes from rhizomes. The inflorescence is an erect to heavily nodding cluster of flowers covered in dark purplish scales. The fruit is coated in a perigynium which is pale yellowish to dark purple to black.

Distribution
This sedge is native to northwestern North America from Alaska to the Northwestern United States, and in California and Utah. Carex spectabilis'' grows in moist mountain habitat in subalpine to alpine climates.

References

External links
Jepson Manual Treatment - Carex spectabilis
USDA Plants Profile: Carex spectabilis
Flora of North America
Carex spectabilis - Photo gallery

spectabilis
Alpine flora
Flora of the Northwestern United States
Flora of the West Coast of the United States
Flora of Alaska
Flora of California
Flora of British Columbia
Flora of Utah
Flora of the Cascade Range
Flora of the Klamath Mountains
Flora of the Sierra Nevada (United States)
Plants described in 1836
Flora without expected TNC conservation status